The Maryland Blue Crab Young Reader Award is a literature award created to recognize high quality books for beginning and transitional readers in kindergarten through fourth grade.  It is granted annually by the Maryland Library Association Children's Services Division (CSD).  The Children's Services Division initiated the award in 2004 as a means of identifying and promoting the best fiction and nonfiction books for beginning readers.

The further intention in granting the Award is to provide teachers, librarians, and caregivers with a resource list of excellent books for beginning readers, and to encourage publishers, authors and illustrators to create high quality, interesting and beautiful books that will entice young readers.

The Award is decided by a committee made up of public librarians and school media specialists who examine qualifying literature published within the calendar year.  The committee considers criteria such as legibility, vocabulary, visual and literary appeal, support matter (i.e. glossaries or pronunciation keys) and appropriateness to the needs of beginning readers.
The committee selects one title each to receive the award in each of the following categories:
 Beginning Fiction
 Beginning Nonfiction
 Transitional Fiction
 Transitional Nonfiction

In addition, the committee generates an honor list of up to three titles for each reading level the award covers. Books that the committee feels are especially appropriate for reluctant older readers are indicated.

Anyone working in a Maryland public library, and members of the Maryland Library Association (MLA), the  Maryland Association of School Librarians (MASL), or the Maryland State Education Association (MSEA), may nominate titles for the award.  Eligibility guidelines and nomination forms are listed on the  Blue Crab page of the Maryland Library Association website.

As of 2012, winners will be announced at the spring CSD Southern/Western Conferences in March and April, respectively.  Prior to this year, winners were announced in October at the fall "Kids Are Customers, Too" conference.  A Blue Crab Award author is frequently invited to speak at either the annual Maryland Library Association Conference in the spring or the Kids Are Customers, Too conference in the fall.

Blue Crab Book Award winners

References

External links
 Official Blue Crab Award Page
 Children's Services Division of the Maryland Library Association
 Maryland Library Association
 Blue Crab Award Facebook Page

American children's literary awards
Maryland education-related lists
Maryland culture
Awards established in 2004